Rowland Township may refer to:

 Rowland Township, Michigan
 Rowland Township, North Carolina